Justice Cole may refer to:

Charles Cleaves Cole (1841–1905), associate justice of the Supreme Court of the District of Columbia
Chester C. Cole, chief justice of the Iowa Supreme Court
James L. Cole, justice of the Louisiana Supreme Court
John Cole (judge), chief justice of the Rhode Island Supreme Court
Luther F. Cole, associate justice of the Louisiana Supreme Court
Orsamus Cole, associate justice of the Wisconsin Supreme Court
Ralph Cole (Ohio representative), substitute associate justice of the Ohio Supreme Court